Andrew Robert Robertson (23 November 1865 – 28 June 1934) was an Australian politician.

He was born in Bacchus Marsh to farmer David Robertson and Agnes Bell Gardiner. He attended state school locally and then went to Scotch College. He worked in insurance for two years before inheriting his father's farm, and around 1897 he married Cissie Jane Kilpatrick, with whom he had five children. In 1903 he won a by-election for the Victorian Legislative Assembly seat of West Bourke, transferring to Bulla the following year. He was a minister without portfolio from 1908 to 1909 and again from 1918 to 1919. A member of the Nationalist Party's Economy faction, he lost his seat in 1924. Robertson died at Bacchus Marsh in 1934.

References

1865 births
1934 deaths
Nationalist Party of Australia members of the Parliament of Victoria
Members of the Victorian Legislative Assembly